was a town located in Hino District, Tottori Prefecture, Japan.

As of 2003, the town had an estimated population of 5,309 and a density of 52.88 persons per km². The total area was 100.40 km². 

On January 1, 2005, Mizokuchi, along with the town of Kishimoto (from Saihaku District), was merged to create the town of Hōki (in Saihaku District).

External links
Official town website (in Japanese)

Dissolved municipalities of Tottori Prefecture
Hōki, Tottori